Cheyney University of Pennsylvania is a public historically black university in Cheyney, Pennsylvania. Founded in 1837, it is the oldest university out of all historically black colleges and universities (HBCUs) in the United States. It is a member of the Pennsylvania State System of Higher Education and the Thurgood Marshall College Fund. The university offers bachelor's degrees and is accredited by the Middle States Commission on Higher Education.

History
Built on land donated by the prominent Cheyney family, the university was founded as the African Institute in February 1837 and renamed the Institute of Colored Youth (ICY) in April 1837.

The African Institute was founded by Richard Humphreys, a Quaker philanthropist who bequeathed $10,000, one-tenth of his estate, to design and establish a school to educate people of African descent and prepare them as teachers.

Born on a plantation on Tortola, an island in the British West Indies, Humphreys came to Philadelphia in 1764. Many Quakers were abolitionists, and he became concerned about the struggles of free people of color to make a living and gain education in a discriminatory society. News of a race riot against free blacks in Cincinnati, Ohio, in 1829 inspired Humphreys to bequeath money in his will for higher education for free blacks. He charged thirteen fellow Quakers to design an institution "to instruct the descendants of the African Race in school learning, in the various branches of the mechanic Arts, trades and Agriculture, in order to prepare and fit and qualify them to act as teachers ..."

Founded as the African Institute, the school was soon renamed the Institute for Colored Youth. In its early years, it provided training in trades and agriculture, as those were the predominant skills needed in the general economy. The name "Cheyney" became associated with the school in 1913. The school's official name changed several times during the 20th century. In 1983, Cheyney was taken into the State System of Higher Education as Cheyney University of Pennsylvania.

The university has traditionally offered opportunities to many students from Philadelphia's inner city schools. Its alumni have close ties in the city and state. It became part of a 1980 civil rights lawsuit against the state government; it alleged that the state had unlawfully underfunded the historically black university. The suit was settled 19 years later in 1999. This was five years after the U.S. Department of Education's Office of Civil Rights began investigating states "that once practiced segregation in higher education and were never officially found to have eliminated it." In the settlement, the state agreed to provide $35 million to Cheyney over a five-year period, particularly for construction of needed buildings and academic development. By comparison, the university had an annual budget of about $23 million at the time.

In November 2015, the Middle States Commission on Higher Education placed Cheyney University on probation. Three years later, the commission placed the university on "show cause" status which required the university to show cause by November 21, 2019, for showing compliance with the commission's standards or accreditation would not be renewed. The accreditation concerns were driven by the university's financial woes, a concern the university sought to address in part with increased fundraising.

On November 21, 2019, the Middle States Commission on Higher Education reaffirmed Cheyney's accreditation as "...the institution is now in compliance with Standard VI (Planning, Resources, and Institutional Improvement) and Requirement of Affiliation 11." The Middle States commission will continue to monitor financial stability of the university, with a report from Cheyney due to the commission on March 1, 2020.

Presidents
Aaron A. Walton, 13th President (May 2017 – present) 
Frank Pogue, 12th President (October 2014 – May 2017) 
Phyllis Worthy Dawkins, Acting President (2014) 
Michelle R. Howard-Vital, 11th President (2007–2014)
Wallace C. Arnold, 10th President (2004–2007)
W. Clinton Pettus, 9th President (1996–2004)
Donald Leopold Mullett, Interim President (1995–1996)
H. Douglas Covington, 8th President (1992–1995)
Valarie Swain-Cade McCoullum (interim) 7th President (1991–1992)
LeVerne McCummings, 6th President (1985–1991)
Wade Wilson, President (1968–1981)
Leroy Banks Allen (1965–1968)
James Henry Duckery (1951–1965) 
Leslie Pinckney Hill, founder and president of then Cheyney State Teachers College (1913–1951)

Principals 
Hugh M. Browne, 4th principal (1902–1913)
Fanny Jackson Coppin, 3rd principal (1869–1902)
Ebenezer Bassett, 2nd principal (1857–1869)
Charles L. Reason, 1st principal of the Institute for Colored Youth (1852–1856)

Campus

The university is partially in Thornbury Township, Chester County, and partially in Thornbury Township, Delaware County.

Cheyney University Quad

Burleigh Hall
Harry T. Burleigh Hall (1928) is named for Harry T. Burleigh, the first critically successful African American composer and a major international figure in the world of music in the 20th century. His works include “Nobody Knows the Trouble I‘ve Seen”. Burleigh also provided insight for the composition of the Cheyney Alma Mater, written by Leslie Pinckney Hill. The building, which forms the eastern end of the historic Quadrangle, was 1842 to 1875. Cope was instrumental in helping to raise funds for the institute throughout his long and loyal tenure as a board member.

Browne Hall
Hugh M. Browne Hall (1938) was originally constructed as a home economics center, and is named for Hugh Mason Browne, who was principal of the school from 1903 to 1913. It subsequently served as Cheyney's reception center, and housing for several administrative offices. Current plans call for renovation after which it will house high achieving students.

Dudley Hall
Dudley Hall (1931), named for Mildred B. Dudley a pioneering music faculty member, was formerly named Pennsylvania Hall. Dudley Hall was originally a gymnasium and later the home of the music department. After a renovation it became a fine arts center and theatre for student productions. The Dudley theatre has seen performances by Ossie Davis and Ruby Dee, in addition to highly regarded student productions.

Carnegie Library

Andrew Carnegie Hall (1909) is located on the quadrangle and is named for one of America's most famous philanthropists, the steel magnate, Andrew Carnegie (1835–1919). Carnegie had a passion for libraries and donated millions for the construction of libraries across the United States. Carnegie donated funding ($10,000) for the first library building constructed for the Institute for Colored Youth (ICY) in 1909. The building served as library, cafeteria, and gymnasium and study area. In 1962 an addition was constructed for classroom use, and now houses the business department. After a renovation in 2005, the grand hall is now used for special receptions & the rest of the building is home to Cheyney's business department.

Emlen Hall
Emlen Hall (1904) is named for Samuel Emlen, Quaker board member, and the founder of the Emlen Institute in Philadelphia, from whose estate the ICY had earlier received considerable financial aid. Construction on Emlen was begun in 1904 and completed in 1905. Emlen was originally a dormitory for women; however, later it was used for staff housing, business support services, and the business school. Currently, it is used for housing for the Keystone Honor Academy Students. Only these honor students are offered the privilege to stay in the historic building.

Humphreys Hall

Richard Humphreys Hall (1903), located on the historic quadrangle, was the very first building constructed under the governance of the Quaker Board of Governors. Construction began in 1903, and the building was in use by 1904. Named in honor of Richard Humphreys (1750–1832), the Quaker philanthropist and founder of the Institute for Colored Youth (ICY), whose will bequeathed the generous donation that enabled the establishment of the institution in 1837. Humphreys Hall has variously been used as a classroom building, industrial building, co-educational dormitory, and combination dining-room/kitchen. Originally called the “Industrial Building”, it was dedicated “Humphreys Hall” in honor of Richard Humphreys in June 1906. After an extensive renovation, the new use of the building is to house Humphrey's Scholars.

Biddle Hall
James G. Biddle Hall (1938), an administration building, is named for James G. Biddle who served on the Cheyney Board from 1912 until his death in 1947. When then-Cheyney Training School for Teachers was purchased by the Commonwealth, he became chairman of the Board of Trustees appointed by the governor. The building previously housed the computer center and math and computer sciences department. After a later renovation, it currently houses offices for the President, Vice Presidents for Student Affairs, and Institutional Advancement, and an art gallery. On the Quad, it is located across from Browne Hall, is parallel to Humphries Hall and diagonal from Burleigh Hall.

Other buildings

Marian Anderson Music Center

Marian Anderson Music Center (1970) is named for the internationally famous contralto from Philadelphia, who performed at Cheyney, and attended the center's dedication ceremony. The classroom building with accompanying auditorium also contains practice suites. The 36,000 square foot facility contains state-of-the-art acoustics and a wireless communication system installed. Marian Anderson (1897–1993) was one of the most celebrated contraltos of the twentieth century.

Marcus A. Foster Student Alumni Center

Marcus A. Foster Student Alumni Center (1970) is named in honor of Marcus Foster, a Cheyney alumnus (class of 1947), and renowned educator, who was assassinated while serving with distinction as superintendent of the Oakland, California, public school system. An addition was constructed in 1975, with accommodations for student and administrative offices, bookstore, lounges, and an auditorium. Currently, it also houses on the third floor a state-of-the-art computer lab, updated in 2016.

Leslie Pinckney Hill Library

Leslie Pinckney Hill Library (1974) was named for Leslie Pinckney Hill (1880–1960), the first president of Cheyney who led the school for thirty-eight years, from 1913 to 1951. The tri-level building is nearly four times the size of the original Carnegie Library that it replaced. Among its treasures are portraits by Laura Wheeler Waring. The library also houses the University Archives. It received an extensive renovation in 2016.

Vaux Hall

Vaux Hall (1960) was constructed as the industrial arts center. Named for two Quaker financial supporters of the institute, George Vaux, Sr. and George Vaux, Jr. Both men furthered Humphreys' bequest for the Institute for Colored Youth, including the Emlen Trust via vigorous fundraising. Vaux Hall served metal technology, drafting and CAD applications, photography, radio and broadcast sciences and printing graphics technology which was a staple of Cheyney University through the early 1990s. Vaux continues in its importance today to the fine arts, and information technology.

Wade Wilson Administration Center

Wade Wilson Administration Center (1979) was named for Wade Wilson (1914–1988), an alumnus, former star athlete, and industrial arts professor. Wilson was the fourth president of Cheyney University, and served as president from 1968 to 1981. During his tenure as president Wilson was an active presence in the legislative arena on behalf of the university. The Wade Wilson building was built in 1980 and occupied in 1981 as the new location for the Office of the President. Later, other administrative offices were moved to the building. Currently, the building houses the offices of the Provost, the Office of the Vice President for Finance, the mailroom, registrar, Human Resources, Financial Aid, and related support offices.

Athletics

Cheyney University has one of the most storied basketball programs in NCAA Division II history. The men's basketball program is 7th all-time in NCAA win percentage, including 16 PSAC conference championships, four Final Fours, and one National Championship (1978). The women's basketball team in 1982 competed in the championship game of the inaugural NCAA Division I tournament despite being a Division II school.

In 2009, Cheyney University hired the first ever NCAA men's and women's basketball coaches who are brother and sister. The men's coach was Dominique Stephens, a North Carolina Central University graduate and member of the NCAA Division II Basketball Championship team, and the women's coach was Marilyn Stephens, the Temple University Hall of Famer.

During the 2007–2008 through 2010–2011 academic years, the university violated NCAA rules in the certification of initial, transfer and continuing eligibility involving all sports programs. During the four-year period, numerous student-athletes competed while ineligible due to improper certification. In amateurism certification alone, 109 student-athletes practiced, competed and received travel expenses and/or athletically related financial aid before the university received their amateurism certification status from the NCAA Eligibility Center. The committee also concluded that a former compliance director failed to monitor when she did not follow proper procedures in the certification of student-athletes’ eligibility. The entire athletics program was on probation until August 2019. In spring 2018, the team withdrew from Division II and played the following season as an independent, citing financial problems.

Student life 
All nine National Pan-Hellenic Council (NPHC) organizations are present on Cheyney University's campus. The following is a collective list of all the NPHC chapters chartered at the university.

Fraternities

Sororities

Notable alumni

See also

 Lincoln University, Pennsylvania's other historically black university

References

Further reading

External links
 
 Cheyney Athletics website

 
School buildings on the National Register of Historic Places in Pennsylvania
Historically black universities and colleges in the United States
Educational institutions established in 1837
African-American history of Pennsylvania
Universities and colleges in Delaware County, Pennsylvania
1837 establishments in Pennsylvania
National Register of Historic Places in Delaware County, Pennsylvania
Antebellum educational institutions that admitted African Americans
Public universities and colleges in Pennsylvania